Harry "Sam" Salmon (born 11 May 1969) is a Canadian luger. He competed in the men's doubles event at the 1988 Winter Olympics. His sister is Kathy Salmon.

References

External links
 

1969 births
Living people
Canadian male lugers
Olympic lugers of Canada
Lugers at the 1988 Winter Olympics
Place of birth missing (living people)